Darragh Canavan (born 2000) is a Gaelic footballer who plays for Errigal Ciarán and the Tyrone county team. He is the son of Peter Canavan, a former All-Ireland winning captain with Tyrone.

Playing career

Club
On 30 September 2018, Canavan made his Tyrone Senior Football Championship debut, scoring a point from the bench in a loss to Coalisland.

Errigal Ciarán reached the county final in 2019, facing Trillick on 13 October. Canavan didn't start the game through injury, coming on as a second-half sub. Trillick won the match by 0–12 to 2–4.

It would be 2022 before Errigal Ciarán reached another county final, where they came up against Carrickmore on 30 October. Canavan scored three points in the 2–11 to 1–12 win. Canavan was named man of the match and also finished as the championship's top scorer.

Inter-county

Minor and under-20
On 11 June 2017, Canavan was at centre forward for the Ulster under-17 final against Cavan. Canavan scored two points as Tyrone were comfortable winners. On 27 August, Tyrone faced Roscommon at Croke Park in the All-Ireland final. Canavan finished with a personal tally of 1–3, as Tyrone were nine-point winners.

On 14 July 2019, Canavan was at centre forward as the Tyrone under-20 team faced Derry in the Ulster final. Tyrone were 4–13 to 1–10 winners, Canavan finishing with two points. On 28 July, Canavan scored 1–1 as Tyrone lost the All-Ireland semi-final by two points to Cork. Canavan was named in the top 20 players in the under-20 championship at the end of the season.

Tyrone were back in the Ulster final in 2020, facing Donegal on 8 March. A goal from Canavan secured a 1–11 to 0–9 victory, and a second provincial title in a row. On 19 October, Canavan scored three points in the All-Ireland semi-final loss to Dublin. At the end of the season, Canavan was once again named in the top 20 players of the championship.

Senior
Canavan joined the Tyrone senior squad in late 2018.
Canavan made his senior debut on 20 December, scoring a point in a Dr McKenna Cup win over Derry.

On 25 October 2020, Canavan made his National League debut, scoring 1–1 in a win over Mayo. Canavan made his championship debut on 1 November, scoring 1–1 in an Ulster quarter-final loss to Donegal.

On 12 June 2021, Canavan suffered a serious ankle injury in a National League match against Kerry. Canavan did not feature for Tyrone until the Ulster final against Monaghan on July 31. Canavan came on as a late substitute as Tyrone won their first provincial title in four years. On 28 August, Canavan was again used as a sub in the All-Ireland semi-final win over Kerry. On 11 September, Tyrone faced Mayo in the All-Ireland final. Canavan scored a point from the bench as Tyrone claimed their fourth All-Ireland crown. Canavan was nominated for the Young Footballer of the Year award at the end of the season.

Honours
Tyrone
 All-Ireland Senior Football Championship (1): 2021
 Ulster Senior Football Championship (1): 2021
 Ulster Under-20 Football Championship (2): 2019, 2020
 All-Ireland Under-17 Football Championship (1): 2017
 Ulster Under-17 Football Championship (1): 2017

Errigal Ciarán
 Tyrone Senior Football Championship (1): 2022

Individual
 Eirgrid 20 Under-20 Award (2): 2019, 2020

References

2000 births
Living people
Tyrone inter-county Gaelic footballers
Errigal Ciarán Gaelic footballers
Winners of one All-Ireland medal (Gaelic football)